Monotagma rudanii is a species of plant in the Marantaceae family. It is endemic to Ecuador.  Its natural habitat is subtropical or tropical moist montane forests.

References

Endemic flora of Ecuador
rudanii
Endangered plants
Taxonomy articles created by Polbot